Manus x Machina: Fashion in an Age of Technology was an exhibition at the Metropolitan Museum of Art that ran from May 5, to September 5, 2016. The exhibition was established due to the dichotomy between Manus (the hand) also known as haute couture and Machina (by machine) also known as prêt-à-porter. With 170+ collection  varying from the 20th Century to present day.

"Exhibition designer Shohei Shigematsu commented, “The diverse range of garments required a neutral, integrated environment to focus on the pairings of manual and mechanical processes. An armature of scaffolding wrapped with a translucent fabric introduces a unique temporarily within a historic institution.” There are so many more aspects to showing fashion. Designing fashion has different and unique steps to it. Shohei Shigematsu also said, "We really wanted to create a shell that integrated the media, garments and texts together. Each of these different porte-cochères showcase the garments, along with projections of their details that work to amplify the craftsmanship in the pieces."

The exhibition explored the evolution of clothing, and the way it's made. It covered the origins of haute couture in the 19th century, the same year the sewing machine was invented. There is a great focus on whether or not hand made or machine made clothing has an influence on the artists creative process. Certain aspects of the exhibition direct the viewers attention to the clothing's DNA by laying out various case studies. The DNA reveals if the article was produced by hand or by machine.

The relationship between garments made by hand and or by machine is very complex, the exhibitions goal was to bring Manus and Manchina together as equals to solving fashion and designer problems around the world. Embracing and utilizing techniques and practices off one another. It advocates for the institutions of the haute couture and prêt-à-porter.

"At the same time, the exhibition questions the cultural and symbolic meanings of the hand-machine dichotomy. Typically, the hand has been identified with exclusivity and individuality as well as with elitism and the cult of personality. Similarly, the machine has been understood to signify not only progress and democracy but also dehumanization and homogenization." 

The incorporation of machines with modern fashion continues to breed new designs and will continuously influence the modern motif of what fashion will and can be.

A dramatic cathedral-like structure, designed by OMA and carefully constructed from white translucent scrims stretched over an intentionally visible framework, featured central domed atrium leading to five porte-cochères. While showcasing exquisite craftsmanship, this exhibit also explored technology's relationship with the handmade.

The exhibition featured pieces by renowned designers such as Maria Grazia Chiuri, Pier Paolo Piccioli, Nicolas Ghesquiere, Iris Van Herpen, Christopher Kane, Karl Lagerfeld, and Miuccia Prada.

The exhibition of Manus x Machina is a prime example of how it is more than just clothing, it is an art. New York Times "Is it Streetwear or Is it Art" is an article that goes into detail about Mr. Thomas's "Gallery Dept" store. It talks about streetwear and his part in the fashion world. What this article highlights is the fact that fashion designs are more than just clothes and dresses but actual art.

Exhibition Galleries 
Manus x Machina's intention was to have the handmade and the machine-made serve as expressions of the designer's creative impulses, to liberate them from their usual haute couture and prêt-à-porter confines.  The galleries that made up the exhibit incorporated the use of traditional handcrafted methods and modern machine methods to create homogenous pieces that highlighted the designers' creativities.

Case Study, Chanel Wedding Ensemble 
Karl Lagerfield's Wedding Ensemble for Chanel is a hand molded, machine sewn, and hand finished garment made from scuba knit, a polyester based fabric, and silk satin.

Broderie (Embroidery)

Plumasserie (Featherwork)

Parurier Floral (Artificial Flowers)

Toiles

Tailleur and Flou (Tailoring and Dressmaking)

Plissé 1 (Pleating)

Plissé 2 (Pleating)

Dentellerie (Lacework)

Maroquinerie (Leatherwork)

References

Metropolitan Museum of Art exhibitions
Fashion exhibitions